Herbert and Katherine Jacobs Second House, often called Jacobs II, is a historic house designed by Frank Lloyd Wright and built west of Madison, Wisconsin, United States in 1946–48. The house was the second of two designed by Frank Lloyd Wright for journalist Herbert Jacobs and his wife Katherine. Its design is unusual among Wright's works; he called the style the "Solar Hemicycle" due to its semicircular layout and use of natural materials and orientation to conserve solar energy. The house was added to the National Register of Historic Places in 1974 and declared a National Historic Landmark in 2003.

Background
By the 1940s when Wright designed this house, he had been working in architecture for fifty years. He had started in 1887 as a draftsman working under other architects in Chicago. In 1893 he struck out on his own and began to shift from designing traditional buildings (e.g. Queen Anne style) to his then-modern Prairie Style buildings, like his 1908 Airplane House 15 miles east in Madison, which is all straight lines with an emphasis on the horizontal. Wright advocated an "organic architecture," where the building complemented its surroundings, rather than plopping a little knob of European antiquity on the Midwest prairie. He felt the design should highlight the natural beauty of the materials and the site, and the interior should flow into the outdoors. Through the 1910s Wright experienced personal turmoils and in the 1920s commissions for his Prairie Style homes waned, but in the 1930s he became more popular again, getting a big commission in 1936 for the Johnson Wax Headquarters in Racine. In Johnson Wax and other buildings from this period he experimented with curved shapes more than before.

Not much was done with passive solar heating in modern buildings in the U.S. until Fred Keck noticed in 1933 that his demonstration glass House of Tomorrow was warming inside on a winter day in Chicago before the furnace was installed. MIT and Columbia investigated solar-heated buildings in the late 1930s, and in 1940 the Chicago Tribune called Keck's Sloan house in Glenview, Illinois a "solar house." This last house had south walls of glass with extended eaves designed to admit sun through the glass in winter and shade it in summer  - an idea Wright incorporated into the Jacobs' second house four years later.

In 1936 Herbert Jacobs, a young Madison newspaperman, and his wife Katherine challenged Wright to design them a small house that could be built for $5000, but would have the beauty and style of other Wright designs. Wright accepted that challenge and stripped down his full-on Prairie Style into a small, one-story L-shaped house with limited windows on the street side, but extensive windows facing the garden space inside the L. The design achieved all the ideals above within the $5000 budget. This house, often called Jacobs I, is a pivotal design - considered by many to be the first and purest of Wright's Usonian houses - his vision for affordable housing in the United States.

Building the second house
But the Jacobs' first house was small, and they quickly outgrew it. In 1942 they moved to a 52-acre farm nine miles west of Madison. "They had decided to become part-time farmers and thus help the war effort while introducing their children to the joys and hardships of farming, which they hoped would build character and proper sense of values." They initially lived in an old farmhouse, but they liked their first house from Wright and asked him to design them a new house. In July 1943 Wright inspected the farm and chose a site with an oak woods behind and a view of rolling hills and valleys to the south. Wright presented one design to the Jacobs - probably an unused design recycled from another client - but it was not what they wanted. Two months later, Wright presented them a very different rough plan saying, "You are getting another 'first'. Here is the answer to the problem of what to build on a hilltop exposed to the full sweep of the wind. In fact, it is suitable for almost any spot in the country where there is good drainage, for the house creates its own site and its own view."

Wright called his new design the Solar Hemicycle. The house's footprint is a segment of a circle, a design which Wright borrowed from his unbuilt 1942 design for Lloyd Burlingham at El Paso. The inside of the arc is a two-story glass wall facing south, so the low-angled winter sun can warm the ample stone and concrete inside. In summer the wide eave above aims to shade the glass wall from the heat of the higher-angled sun. The outside of the arc faces generally north and is sheltered by an earthen berm which protects the house like the collar of a coat from cold north winds. The glass side echoes the first Jacobs house, facing a private green backyard - in this case a sunken garden surrounded by a stone terrace. Also, the front side has a high band of narrow windows above the berm to admit light and air. The exterior stonework is horizontal limestone slabs laid to suggest natural outcrops, fulfilling Wright's ideal of the structure fitting its site, and the same outcrop-like stonework flows inside the house.

The front entrance is a tunnel through the berm. From the tunnel, the visitor emerges onto the terrace at the end of the wall of windows, then enters the house via a glass door. The first floor is one large space seventeen feet deep with the kitchen on one end and a dining room and living room the rest. Wright wrote, "Here in one room is the whole affair of good living - the warmth and invitation of a true home." The floor was a 3.5 inch concrete slab poured over gravel with iron heating pipes carrying hot water for radiant heat - similar to the first Jacobs house. Before the far end of the main room Wright designed a pool in the floor with one side in the house and the other outside. The pool repeats the circle motif and embodies Wright's ideal of having the indoor space flow smoothly to the outside. (His idea was that it be a fish tank, where the fish could swim in and out.) The circle is also repeated in the shape of the fireplace and the round stone tower at the back wall which contains a staircase to the second story. An open balcony hangs from the rafters, curving around the glass wall side. The space behind was eventually partitioned into four bedrooms. A bathroom is at the same level in the round stone tower. 

Due to their weight, the house's stone walls were not built on the concrete floor, as was common in other Wright houses; rather, deep foundations filled with five feet of crushed stone supported the walls. The roof was flat, sealed with tar and gravel, and sloped to direct water to the berm side. The big windows were 1/4-inch plate glass salvaged from old stores. Total floor space was about  - significantly larger than the Jacobs first house.

Construction took years. After considering Wright's new plan for a bit, the Jacobs decided to go ahead and paid Wright the first installment of his fee - $250 - in March 1944. Wright didn't produce the detailed plans for 2.5 years. Then in October 1946 Wright's apprentices arrived with a bulldozer to scrape out the sunken garden and the space for the house. That winter Herb Jacobs himself dug the holes for the foundations and packed crushed rock into them. In June, Wright's apprentices staked out the location of the house. Jacobs served as his own general contractor and hired a local farmer/stonemason. The mason and his assistants worked for a couple days, then disappeared for six months, busy with other projects. When they resumed laying stone, Katherine herself took over raking the joints. Around that time Wright himself also dropped out of the project, offended by a comment Herbert had written in We Chose the Country. The Jacobs took the opportunity to deviate from Wright's design a bit, converting the outside of the fish pond to a plunge pool, shortening the glass doors so their children could operate them, and adding a "root cellar" - a square room hidden between the house and the berm. This was a practical feature that Jacobs had requested, but Wright had not fit into the plan. The Jacobs sold their farmhouse, thinking the new house would be ready for move-in by July 1948, but they were too optimistic, so the family moved into the root cellar July 8. They moved into the main house at the end of August, 1948.

Shortly after the move-in, Wright reappeared outside by the sunken garden looking at the project. "Invited in, he toured the house, had a piece of apple pie, and left without ever mentioning the eight month estrangement, perhaps relieved... to find the house had been built without significant deviations from his plans." After that, Wright helped them finish the house, sending a bulldozer to shape the berm. Over the following months Jacobs finished the bedroom partitions. It was 1958 when he finally built the dining room table Wright had designed.

After construction
Wright went on to design other houses as sections of circles. He offered a mirror image of the Jacobs II design (with a room added in place of the Jacobs' "root cellar") to E.L. Marting in 1947 and to Donald Grover in 1950, but these houses were not built. Other hemicycle houses were built: the 1948 Meyer house in Galesburg, Michigan, the 1949 Laurent house in Rockford Illinois, and the 1950 Pearce house in Bradbury, California. None of these was oriented to catch the sun, so they were hemicycles, but not solar.

Wright and the Jacobs remained friends for life. Wright sometimes brought a prospective client by to look at the house and the Jacobs visited at Taliesin from time to time. The Jacobs' daughter eventually married into the Taliesin family. Wright died in 1959. The Jacobs semi-retired in 1962 and moved to California to be near the daughter. In 1978 Herb published a book about their experiences: Building with Frank Lloyd Wright: An Illustrated Memoir.

William R. Taylor, a history professor at the UW, bought the house from the Jacobs in 1962. The Taylors lived there until 1968, then moved out and rented the house to students for thirteen years. Son Bill Taylor bought the house in 1983 and renovated it, addressing some of the issues that had emerged in the 35 years since construction. He had John Frieburger and Associates rebuild the window wall, replacing single-pane glass with more efficient triple-pane windows, and replacing the dry-rotting wooden frames. (The new frames are simplified from what Wright designed.) Investigating why the house was hard to heat, they found that the heating pipes in the floor had been laid in the gravel under the concrete with no insulation underneath, and the gravel had settled so there was a gap between it and the concrete, so much of the heat went down instead of up. They broke out the old floor and repoured it, with insulation beneath and with the pipes in the concrete. Taylor also added a hot air furnace and air conditioning, repartitioned the four small bedrooms into three, beefed up the joists and rafters, and added skylights to naturally illuminate some dark areas better.

The second Jacobs house is significant in several ways. Frank Lloyd Wright was an important architect. While this house in some ways continues his previous designs, it marks the first time he applied curved shapes to a home design. It also marks an early venture into passive use of solar energy in a home. For these, the house was added to the National Register of Historic Places in 1974. Beyond that, in 2003 the house was designated a National Historic Landmark. In the nomination  Dr. Paul Sprague writes:  The second Jacobs house is an incredibly imaginative design. It is equally unique among the houses of Wright's contemporaries. As a house in which Wright took a special interest, he designed it from scratch and entrusted it to clients whom he knew were capable of building the unusual house without deviating significantly from the plans. It stands out also as one of Wright's more eloquent aesthetic masterpieces. It is not just any house but belongs with the outstanding buildings produced by the fertile mind of the master architect, Frank Lloyd Wright.

See also

 National Register of Historic Places listings in Madison, Wisconsin
 List of National Historic Landmarks in Wisconsin
 Herbert and Katherine Jacobs First House

References

External links

 "Making Wright Right" - restoration of Herbert and Katherine Jacobs Second House
 The WHS reference above has some good photographs of the house.

Further reading
 Sprague's NHL nomination among the references above contains lots of detail and is available online.
 Storrer's book among the references above includes rough floorplans.

Frank Lloyd Wright buildings
National Historic Landmarks in Wisconsin
Houses in Madison, Wisconsin
Houses completed in 1948
Houses on the National Register of Historic Places in Wisconsin
National Register of Historic Places in Madison, Wisconsin